Westleigh can refer to:

Places
 Westleigh, Mid Devon, England
 Westleigh, North Devon, England
 Westleigh, Greater Manchester, England
 Westleigh, New South Wales, Australia

Other uses
 Westleigh railway station, Greater Manchester, England

See also
 West Leigh, Albemarle County, Virginia, United States